Maxwell & Jill Scott: The Tour is a co-headlining concert tour by American recording artists Maxwell and Jill Scott. Heavily playing in the United States, the tour supported Maxwell's fourth studio album BLACKsummers'night. Singer Erykah Badu joined as a featured performer on select dates. Maxwell and Scott planned a second leg of the tour for the summer of 2010 (with Melanie Fiona as an opening act), however the leg was canceled abruptly. It was later revealed Maxwell postponed the tour dates until 2011, without Scott joining.

Background
Following the success of his album and 2009 tour with Common, Maxwell continued promoting his album in the U.S. and other countries for an arena tour with Jill Scott. The tour was announced by various media outlets in March 2010. Many critics deemed the tour an ideal pairing, contrasting the different styles of the artists. Although his last tour was successful, Maxwell admitted to prefer playing small venues for their intimate feel but felt he need to "[tour] bigger". He continued, "Last year, I did a bunch of arenas with Common. It wasn't what I expected. I love a small club; I love a small theater. But it was time for me to do something new, to stretch a bit. You've got to think big. I like to walk around during sound check. Then I know, 'Oh, this is what it's like to be over here, looking at the stage.'"  Scott was set to release her fourth album during the run of the tour, however, it was postponed until 2011. To introduce the tour, she stated:"[The show] a great night for music lovers. And everyone who wants to shake a little tail feather or feel romantic, whatever the case may be"

Second leg cancellation
Despite the success of the first leg of the tour, Maxwell decided to cancel the remaining dates of the tour at the last moment. An official statement was released citing "scheduling conflicts with venues" was the reason behind the cancellation. However, media outlets began to speculate a true reason for the tour's cancellation. Many reported the singer was upset at Scott and special guest Badu going over their set times, with Maxwell being the last performer on the tour. The singer stated he would postpone dates until his 2011 for his fifth studio album, blackSUMMERs'night.

Opening Act
 Guy Torry (select dates)

Set list
USA

Jill Scott

Maxwell

Source:

Tour dates

Cancellations and rescheduled shows

References

Maxwell (musician) concert tours
Jill Scott (singer) concert tours
2010 concert tours
Co-headlining concert tours